The 2021–22 curling season began in June 2021 and ended in May 2022.

Note: In events with two genders, the men's tournament winners will be listed before the women's tournament winners.

World Curling Federation events

Source:

Championships

Qualification events

Other events

Curling Canada events

Source:

Championships

Other events

Qualification events

Provincial and territorial playdowns

National championships

Austria

Czech Republic

Denmark

England

Estonia

Finland

Hungary

Ireland

Italy

Japan

Latvia

Mexico

New Zealand

Norway

Russia

Scotland

South Korea

Sweden

Switzerland

United States

Tour events

Grand Slam events in bold.
Note: More events may be posted as time progresses.

Teams
See: List of teams in the 2021–22 curling season

World Curling Tour sanctioned events

Men's events

Source:

Women's events

Source:

Mixed doubles events

Source:

Other events

Men's events

Source:

Women's events

Source:

Mixed doubles events

Source:

WCF rankings

Notes

References

2021 in curling
2022 in curling
Seasons in curling